Long Creek Township, Arkansas may refer to:

 Long Creek Township, Boone County, Arkansas
 Long Creek Township, Carroll County, Arkansas
 Long Creek Township, Searcy County, Arkansas

See also 
 List of townships in Arkansas
 Long Creek Township (disambiguation)

Arkansas township disambiguation pages